Alicia is a genus of sea anemones in the family Aliciidae and contains the following species:

Alicia beebei Carlgren, 1940
Alicia mirabilis Johnson, 1861
Alicia pretiosa (Dana, 1846)
Alicia rhadina Haddon & Shackleton, 1893
Alicia sansibarensis Carlgren, 1900
Alicia uruguayensis Carlgren, 1927

References

External links

Aliciidae
Hexacorallia genera